Ghazali is an Arabic surname and given name.  It may refer to:

 Abu Hamed Mohammad ibn Mohammad Ghazali (c. 1058–1111), Persian philosopher, theologian, jurist and mystic
 Ahmad Ghazali (c. 1061–1123 or 1126), Persian mystic
 Janbirdi al-Ghazali (died 1521),  Ottoman Governor of Damascus
 Kacem El Ghazzali, Moroccan activist
 Lynda Ghazzali, Malaysian porcelain painter
 Mohammed Ghazali, Pakistani cricketer
 Mohammed al-Ghazali (1917–1996), Islamic cleric and scholar
 Nadia Ghazzali, Moroccan-Canadian statistician and university administrator
 Nazem Al-Ghazali (1921-1963), Iraqi singer
 Rustum Ghazali, Syrian politician
 Youcef Ghazali, Algerian footballer
 Zainab al Ghazali (1917-2005), Egyptian activist
 Ghazali bin Marzuki, Singaporean murder victim of the Toa Payoh child murders in 1981

See also
 Adam Gazzaley, American neuroscientist, author, photographer, entrepreneur and inventor

Arabic-language surnames